Ashareh Beyt-e Yabareh (also Romanized as ʿAshāreh Beyt-e Yabāreh; also known as Beyt-e Yabāreh) is a village in Ahudasht Rural District, Shavur District, Shush County, Khuzestan Province, Iran. At the 2006 census, its population was 180, in 24 families.

References 

Populated places in Shush County